Ailia punctata, also known as the Jamuna ailia is a species of catfish in the family Ailiidae native to Bangladesh, India and Pakistan. The species is heavily fished and other threats include habitat loss, pollution and introduced species but the exact effects are unknown. This species grows to a length of  TL.

References

Fish of Asia
Fish of Bangladesh
Fish of India
Fish of Pakistan
Taxa named by Francis Day